Praha-Satalice railway station is located on line 070 between Prague and Turnov, in the district of Satalice, part of the Prague 9 administrative district. The line as it runs in and out of the station is single tracked, the nearest passing point being at Čakovice. The station building was listed as a cultural monument in 2002.

References

Satalice
Railway stations opened in 1872